The 1971 Cork Intermediate Hurling Championship was the 62nd staging of the Cork Intermediate Hurling Championship since its establishment by the Cork County Board in 1909. The draw for the opening round fixtures took place on 30 January 1972. The championship began on 11 April 1971 and ended on 7 November 1971.

On 7 November 1971, Nemo Rangers won the championship following a 4–11 to 2–03 defeat of Carrigtwohill in a final replay. This was their third championship title overall and their first title since 1928.

Team changes

To Championship

Promoted from the Cork Junior Hurling Championship
 Cloughduv

Entered their second team
Blackrock

From Championship

Promoted to the Cork Senior Hurling Championship
 Cloyne

Regraded to North Cork Junior A Hurling Championship
 Kilworth

Results

First round

 Castletownroche received a bye in this round.

Quarter-finals

Semi-finals

Final

References

Cork Intermediate Hurling Championship
Cork Intermediate Hurling Championship